The western Cuban nesophontes (Nesophontes micrus) is an extinct species of mammal in the family Nesophontidae. It was found on Cuba and Hispaniola. It was recently discovered to include three previously thought species: N. submicrus, N. longirostris, and N. superstes.

References

Nesophontes
Holocene extinctions
Extinct animals of Cuba
Extinct animals of Haiti
Mammals of the Caribbean
Mammals of Cuba
Mammals of Haiti
Taxonomy articles created by Polbot
Taxa named by Glover Morrill Allen